Sobolevo is a rural locality (a selo) and the administrative center of Sobolevsky District, Kamchatka Krai, Russia. Population:

Climate 
Sobolevo has a rare, dry-summer variant of subarctic climate (Köppen climate classification Dsc) with very long, frigid winters – although about  less cold than interior Siberia at the same latitude – and short, very mild summers. Precipitation is much higher than most subarctic climates and peaks in the autumn when the Sea of Okhotsk is still unfrozen and string onshore winds from the Siberian High and Aleutian Low are usual.

References

Notes

Sources

Rural localities in Kamchatka Krai